Shivtar Shiv is an Indian cinematographer and director associated with Punjabi films.

Career 
Shivtar Shiv started his career as Cinematographer. Then he started working along in other fields like Direction and he started his career as an assistant D.O.P with Jatinder Sairaj. He is born and brought up in Nabha district of Punjab. He first worked as an assistant cameraman for ATN Punjabi channel. After that he did some TV serials. Also, He was the assistant of Rajesh Verma in TV serial 'India's Most Wanted'. Later, he worked as assistant cameraman in serial Virasat at Doordarshan and for lishkara channel where he assisted Akram Sheikh. Then, Shiv stepped into music videos where he was the assistant of Manjit Singh. He did more than 1200 music videos with Punjabi singers and directors.

Now, he has also become a D.O.P and Director. He directed Punjabi movie 'Saggi Phull' in 2018 and worked as cinematographer for movies like Once Upon A Time In Amritsar (2016) and Patta Patta Singhan Da Vairi (2015).

Filmography

References

External links 
 
 

Indian cinematographers
Indian film directors
Living people
Year of birth missing (living people)